The 2006 Sharpie 500 was a NASCAR Winston Cup Series race held on August 26, 2006, at Bristol Motor Speedway, in Bristol, Tennessee. Contested over 500 laps on the 0.533 mile (0.857 km) concrete short track, it was the 24th race of the 2006 NASCAR Nextel Cup Series season. Matt Kenseth of Roush Racing won the race.

Qualifying

Race recap
The Sharpie 500, one of the most popular races on the circuit and NASCAR's twenty-fourth race of the season, was held on August 26, 2006, under the lights on the 0.533-mile Bristol International Speedway. Kurt Busch won the pole for this event. Matt Kenseth won his second straight Nextel Cup race and, along with points leader Jimmie Johnson, clinched a berth in the Chase for the Nextel Cup.

Results

Race Statistics
 Time of race: 2:57:37
 Average Speed: 
 Pole Speed: 
 Cautions: 10 for 62 laps
 Margin of Victory: 0.591 sec
 Lead changes: 18
 Percent of race run under caution: 12.4%         
 Average green flag run: 39.8 laps

References

Sharpie 500
Sharpie 500
NASCAR races at Bristol Motor Speedway
August 2006 sports events in the United States